In atomic physics, a two-electron atom or helium-like ion is a quantum mechanical system consisting of one nucleus with a charge of Ze and just two electrons. This is the first case of many-electron systems where the Pauli exclusion principle plays a central role.

It is an example of a three-body problem.

The first few two-electron atoms are:

Schrödinger equation
The Schrödinger equation for any two-electron system, such as the neutral Helium atom (He, Z = 2), the negative Hydrogen ion (H−, Z = 1), or the positive Lithium ion (Li+, Z = 3) is: For a more rigorous mathematical derivation of Schrödinger's equation, see also.

where r1 is the position of one electron (r1 = |r1| is its magnitude), r2 is the position of the other electron (r2 = |r2| is the magnitude), r12 = |r12| is the magnitude of the separation between them given by

μ is the two-body reduced mass of an electron with respect to the nucleus of mass M

and Z is the atomic number for the element (not a quantum number).

The cross-term of two Laplacians

is known as the mass polarization term, which arises due to the motion of atomic nuclei. The wavefunction is a function of the two electron's positions:

There is no closed form solution for this equation.

Spectrum
The optical spectrum of the two electron atom has two systems of lines.  A para system of single lines, and an ortho system of triplets (closely spaced group of three lines).  The energy levels in the atom for the single lines are indicated by 1S0 1P1 1D2 1F3 etc., and for the triplets, some energy levels are split: 3S1 3P2 3P1 3P0 3D3 3D2 3D1 3F4 3F3 3F2. Alkaline earths and mercury also have spectra with similar features, due to the two outer valence electrons.

See also
Hydrogen-like atom
Hydrogen molecular ion
Helium atom
Lithium atom

References

Atoms
Quantum models